HMS Iron Duke is a Type 23 frigate of the Royal Navy, and the third ship to bear the name.

Iron Duke has intercepted several large consignments of illegal drugs being sent from the Caribbean to Europe.

In her only combat mission, she was in action off Libya in 2011, destroying a gun battery outside the besieged town of Misrata. She also fired star shells through the night to illuminate pro-Gadaffi positions for NATO aircraft to destroy rocket launchers, fuel dumps, ammo stores, artillery batteries and command and control centres, whilst also confirming that no civilians were in the area.

Commissioning and construction

Iron Duke was launched on 2 March 1991 by Lady Jane King in the presence of the Duke and Duchess of Wellington.  Her affiliated town is Kingston upon Hull, and she is named after Arthur Wellesley, the first Duke of Wellington (the "Iron Duke"). She was the fifth Duke-class Type 23 frigate to be launched for the Royal Navy, at a cost of £140 million.

The motto of Iron Duke is Virtutis Fortuna Comes (Latin: "Fortune is the companion of valour") – inherited from the 33rd (The Duke of Wellington's) Regiment of Foot.

Iron Duke carries a number of weapons and sensors which make her a multi-purpose combat vessel. Like all T23s, her original design role was anti-submarine warfare, but she can be employed in a variety of roles.  She carries a Lynx Helicopter which can be used in an anti-submarine and anti-surface role as well as for humanitarian and search and rescue purposes.

More recently, Iron Duke has been the First of Class fit for the Royal Navy's new Type 997 Artisan 3D, successfully firing her missile system, using the new radar combined with the updated 'SWMLU' Seawolf missile targeting system, in the English Channel.

Operational history

1993–2000

Iron Duke relieved Argyll of her duties in September. During this incident Argyll, assisted by Ocean, laid the foundation for the Iron Duke Community School;a school for orphans in Freetown. President Kabbah of Sierra Leone decreed the school be named after the Iron Duke in honour of their crew completing the construction of the six classrooms.

During this deployment Iron Duke also visited the Falkland Islands, Brazil, Ghana, Senegal and attended Exponaval 2000 when she made a good will visit to Valparaiso, Chile, to help improve relations with the UK's traditional ally. This was the RN's first visit since the General Pinochet affair.

2001–2010
In May 2002 Iron Duke re-entered service after a refit, armed with a new 4.5 inch Mod 1 gun. Under the command of Commander Phil Warwick, Iron Duke sailed into Portsmouth for her re-dedication. Amongst those in attendance were the present Duke of Wellington and Earl Jellicoe, both related to figures associated with the ship's name and career. The following January Iron Duke deployed to the Caribbean for counter-drugs operations, hurricane season disaster relief standby, and visiting UK Overseas Territories for diplomatic purposes. This was the frigate's first operation since completing her refit at the end of 2001 and comprehensive training including multi-national exercises off Scotland.

In February 2006 Iron Duke conducted trials in Loch Goil and Loch Fyne.

In September 2006 Iron Duke, under Commander Andy Jordan, was providing a presence for UK overseas territories in the Caribbean and providing the UK contribution to the war on drugs. She returned to the UK in December 2006.

In 2007 Iron Duke, now under the command of Commander Andy Gurr, was dry-docked for ten months at HMNB Portsmouth. Various systems were upgraded including the anti-submarine warfare equipment, and the ability to operate the Merlin helicopter was added. The first installation of a NATO Radial Chemical, Biological, Radioactive, Nuclear filter system was made; this filter was undergoing trials prior to installation across the fleet, if successful.

After 18 months of refit and upgrading, by March 2008 Iron Duke was halfway through her Operational Sea Training, in readiness for deployment to the North Atlantic at the end of May.  All aspects of warfare were included in the training, including the infamous 'Thursday War' training exercise.

On 18 April 2008 Iron Duke deployed to Avonmouth to train in sea and harbour safety. Avon and Somerset Police assisted in training in the co-operation between the Royal Navy and uniformed police in the event of harbour security being breached. Civic dignitaries also viewed the ship. Later in April the Iron Dukes Operational Sea Training increased in difficulty with a simulation of tension between Brownian and Ginger forces with negotiations in neutral Freeport (Devonport) and a high risk of terrorist attacks. This exercise tested the defensive capabilities of the ship and the flexibility of proportional response to threats. Later in the series of exercises a hurricane hit the simulated island of Bullpoint, allowing Iron Duke to test her disaster relief capabilities including first aid, providing food and shelter to the survivors and helping to rebuild basic amenities.

Iron Duke visited her home town, Kingston upon Hull, over the weekend of 26 to 29 April 2008 and was open to the public for six hours.

By Friday 13 June Iron Duke arrived in Lisbon, Portugal after two operational stand-offs to determine that she was ready to deploy operationally. Iron Duke was briefed by the Maritime Analysis and Operations Centre-Narcotics, a pan-European counter-narcotics agency, about intelligence on criminal matters such as cannabis and cocaine smuggling on the high seas.  She then moved to Gibraltar for re-supply and the infamous Rock Run. Iron Duke was now on Maritime Security Patrol in the North Atlantic.

As of 31 August 2008 Iron Duke was dispatched to assist relief efforts for the Atlantic Hurricane Gustav.

Iron Duke has intercepted illegal drugs being shipped from the Caribbean to Europe on several occasions, sometimes aided by embarked United States Coast Guard personnel. Large shipments were intercepted on 25 June 2003 (3.7 tonnes of cocaine on MV Yalta), 2 June 2008 (900 kilograms of cocaine in a speedboat which later sank), late July 2009 (drugs with a street value of £33 million on a speedboat later sunk by gunfire). and September 2009 (5.5 tonnes of cocaine).

2011–present

She entered the Joint Operating Area on 16 July 2011 and over the course of the next five days, she went to Action Stations several times to support operations ashore. She was responsible for the destruction of a gun battery outside the besieged town of Misrata, while the frigate’s 4.5-inch gun fired many illuminating starshells to light up targets for NATO planes.
She returned to Portsmouth in late July, in a joint homecoming with her sister ship 

The Royal Navy's next generation helicopter, Wildcat, completed 20 days of demanding trials aboard Iron Duke, her first frigate, in January 2012.

In March 2012 Iron Duke began a major refit in HM Naval Base, Portsmouth. Some major parts of the work package took place for the first time on a Type 23 class of ship, as the MOD looks to extend the life of the Type 23 frigates beyond the original time frame to coincide with the introduction of the Type 26 class of ships, the first which is currently expected to enter service as soon as possible after 2020. Also included in the refit was the installation of BAE Systems Artisan medium-range 3D surveillance radar and in June 2013 she was put back at sea. She test fired 7.62mm rounds from her General Purpose Machine Guns and Mini-Guns, 3lb ceremonial guns and the torpedo system. In early 2014, she successfully fired her new 'SWMLU' Seawolf missile system against towed targets, destroying two simulated hostile aircraft skimming the surface of the sea, targeting from the brand new 3D radar system.

On 20 June 2014, Iron Duke deployed on operations for the first time since her refit. The frigate will sail down the Atlantic, gradually working its way down south via the west coast of Africa to the British Overseas Territories in the region. It is a routine deployment known as Atlantic Patrol Tasking (South). On 20 August 2014, Iron Duke received a 21 gun salute as she approached Robben Island to dock at the V&A Waterfront in Cape Town, South Africa.

In January 2016, Iron Duke sailed on a six-month deployment including being tasked to Standing NATO Maritime Group 1. She took part in Exercise Dynamic Guard, and Exercise BALTOPS 16.

In June 2017, Iron Duke was assigned to maritime security operations and training around the United Kingdom but deployed at short notice to represent the Royal Navy in the BALTOPS exercise in the Baltic. Upon completion of the exercise she took part in Kiel Week 2017.

Iron Duke was exhibited at the National Armed Forces day in Liverpool which ran from 24–25 June 2017 where the prime minister Theresa May visited the ship. Iron Duke was also open to the public. It was reported in 2018 that Iron Duke was laid up alongside in Portsmouth as a training ship since mid-2017, owing to a lack of manpower to fully crew the ship. In January 2019, the ship was towed out of Portsmouth for a major refit at Devonport, Plymouth. This 'LIFEX' refit would add Sea Ceptor, Artisan radar and new diesel generator sets.

Notable billeting
Prince William served on Iron Duke in the Caribbean for 5 weeks from late June 2008 with the rank of sub-lieutenant.

Affiliations
His Grace, The Duke of Wellington
The Yorkshire Regiment (14th/15th, 19th and 33rd/76th Foot)
No. 31 Squadron RAF
Yorkshire Universities Royal Naval Unit (YURNU) serving the universities of Hull, Leeds and Sheffield.
Jersey
City of Kingston upon Hull
Worshipful Company of Founders
The Training ship Iron Duke
Wellington College
Victoria College CCF, Jersey

References

External links

 

Frigates of the United Kingdom
Ships built on the River Clyde
1991 ships
Type 23 frigates of the Royal Navy